Port and Starboard are a pair of adult male orcas notable for preying on great white sharks off the coast of South Africa. The duo are identified as having rare and distinct collapsed dorsal fins and they are named for the nautical terms, as Port's fin collapses left and Starboard's collapses right. Port and Starboard are part of a distinctive "flat-toothed" ecotype present around South Africa.

History
Port and Starboard were first reported near Lüderitz in 2009 and are often sighted travelling off the coast of Gansbaai, Port Elizabeth, Cape Town, and most notably in False Bay. Prior to 2015, it was believed that orcas entering into the False Bay area only preyed on marine mammals but reports of the pair hunting copper shark and ocean sunfish soon began. However, the duo's most notable prey have been great white sharks. The sharks began washing ashore in 2015 with nothing but their livers removed. Examination of the carcasses reveal that orcas open the sharks between their pectoral fins in order to remove the fatty livers and likely induce tonic immobility to accomplish this safely.

Before 2015, False Bay was infamous for its hundreds of great whites but by 2020 sightings were reduced to nearly zero. At least seven great whites believed to have been killed by the duo were found in 2017 including one famous female measuring  named Khaleesi (after the fictional character) that was discovered washed ashore and with her liver removed.

In August 2019, five deceased great whites were found with their livers removed, and Port and Starboard are believed to be the culprits. In addition, deceased copper sharks and broadnose sevengill sharks have been discovered with their livers removed in a similar fashion. This is the first time orcas have been documented using this precision feeding technique in this region.

Starboard was first filmed killing a great white in May 2022 around Mossel Bay, alongside 4 other orcas  – this was the first time ever this predation has been filmed. After the attack, white sharks in the area fled for at least 7 weeks.

On the 24th February, 2023, at least 17 sevengill sharks were attacked and killed off the coast of Pearly Beach by the two orcas. All of their livers had been precisely removed and consumed, in the same manner as their previous attacks on sharks.

Effects
There are concerns as to the effect the disappearance of great whites in False Bay will have on the local ecosystem, as the sharks serve as the main predator of the local population of Cape fur seals. Scientists believe that the appearance of Port and Starboard, commercial fishing, and climate change are likely the major contributing factors to the mass exodus of the sharks. Additionally, the major tourist attraction of shark cage diving has ceased in recent years without the appearance of great whites, impacting the local economy. The Discovery Channel's Air Jaws film series has also been affected by the disappearance of the famous breaching sharks.

Behavioural studies
Some researchers theorize that Port and Starboard may be older males, as evidenced by their collapsed dorsal fins. The duo may have abandoned their transient lifestyle after finding it more effective and efficient to hunt sharks instead of the faster, more intelligent marine mammals such as dolphins and pinnipeds. Marine biologist Dr. Ingrid Visser has documented that orcas will ram into great white sharks in order to flip them upside down into a catatonic state known as tonic immobility. From there, the whale will take hold of the pectoral fins and violently shake it until the liver is exposed. Similar occurrences have been reported in the Farallon Islands off the coast of San Francisco and once orcas enter the area, the sharks leave for many months. In his research, ecologist Salvador Jorgensen has found that different pods of orcas have entered False Bay previously and this did not cause the sharks to flee in the manner that Port and Starboard have. He believes that the pair behave more like the offshore ecotype of orcas who eat both marine mammals and sharks.

See also
 List of individual cetaceans

References

Fauna of South Africa
Individual orcas